Ionuț Andrei Moisă (born 7 February 2002) is a Romanian professional footballer who plays as a midfielder. He made his Liga I debut on 18 January 2021, in a match between Politehnica Iași and FC Voluntari, won by Botoșani, score 1–0.

References

External links
 

2002 births
Living people
Sportspeople from Iași
Romanian footballers
Association football midfielders
Liga I players
FC Politehnica Iași (2010) players